The following is a list of colleges and universities in the U.S. state of  New Mexico.

Institutions

Former institutions

See also
 Higher education in the United States
 List of American institutions of higher education
 List of college athletic programs in New Mexico
 List of colleges and universities
 List of colleges and universities by country
 List of recognized higher education accreditation organizations
 List of tribal colleges and universities

Notes

References

New Mexico
Universities and colleges